The alley-oop is an American football play in which the quarterback throws the ball high into the air, and another player jumps up and catches it. The play was developed in 1957 by San Francisco 49ers players Y. A. Tittle and R. C. Owens. The play was named after V. T. Hamlin's comic strip character Alley Oop; Owens himself was also known as "Alley Oop". It was highly successful when utilized due to Owens' 6 ft 3 in height and ability to out-leap defenders.

Tittle said of the play: "With the Alley-Oop now considered to be a legitimate weapon, the only defense against it was a defensive back who could outleap R.C. – and at that time, no such animal existed in the NFL."

According to the Oxford English Dictionary, the usage of the term in football predates its usage in basketball by two years, with the football counterpart also inspiring the play in basketball.

See also
 Alley-oop (basketball)
 Hail Mary pass

References

American football plays